"Alive Again" is a song written by James Pankow for the group Chicago and recorded for their album Hot Streets (1978), with Peter Cetera singing lead vocals. The first single released from that album, it reached No. 14 on the U.S. Billboard Hot 100 chart.  In Canada, "Alive Again" spent two weeks at No. 11.

"Alive Again" was Chicago's first new single after their split with producer James William Guercio. It was also their first single after the accidental death of Terry Kath; Donnie Dacus played guitar on the recording.

Recording and Production
According to Mike Stahl, Chicago's live audio engineer at the time, members of Chicago's rhythm section–Robert Lamm, Donnie Dacus, Peter Cetera and Danny Seraphine–came into the studio, started "jamming", and then played what they thought would be a run-through of "Alive Again". Producer Phil Ramone had recorded the run-through, and despite recording the rhythm track ten more times, the run-through had the "feel" he was looking for, so the run-through made it to the album.

After the recording of "Alive Again" had been completed, Chicago's brass section recorded with the Bee Gees on their song, "Tragedy". Inspired by his work with Barry Gibb, James Pankow rewrote the brass charts for "Alive Again" and the song was rerecorded with the new brass charts. Mike Stahl said the new arrangements gave the song a whole new "feeling" and "sparkle".

Cash Box said it has " aggressive horns, high riding vocals, tight and melodic structure and a bright optimism." Record World said that the song "rocks stronger than previous [Chicago] releases with the guitar work and Cetera's lead vocals of prime interest."

Personnel
 Peter Cetera - lead & backing vocals, bass
 Donnie Dacus - backing vocals, electric & acoustic guitars
 Robert Lamm - Fender Rhodes electric piano, backing vocals
 Danny Seraphine - drums
 Laudir de Oliveira - percussion
 James Pankow - trombone
 Lee Loughnane - trumpet
 Walter Parazaider - tenor saxophone

Chart performance

Weekly charts

Year-end charts

Popular culture
The opening guitar and horns riff of this song was used in the opening highlights montage by the NBA on CBS from 1979 to 1981.
An instrumental version was used as the opening theme to the syndicated radio show The Don & Mike Show in 2003.

References

External links
 

1978 singles
Chicago (band) songs
Songs written by James Pankow
Song recordings produced by Phil Ramone
Columbia Records singles
CBS Sports
1978 songs